Fatum can refer to:

 Fatum (film), a 1915 Dutch film
 Fatum (Tchaikovsky), a symphonic poem by Pyotr Ilyich Tchaikovsky